The Rohrbach Ro IX "Rofix" was a German all-metal monoplane fighter aircraft designed in February 1924 by Kurt Tank for Rohrbach.

History
The initial order for the aircraft was for two test aircraft, with a view of producing 50. Construction began in April 1926, and by the summer, the first prototype, with serial number 22, was complete. The prototype was tested in Denmark due to aircraft building restrictions on Germany at the time. However twice the prototype crashed, first in January 1927, and again 15 July 1927 killing the pilot Paul Bäumer. Despite good characteristics in flight and landing, some problems led to modifications. It was powered by a 600 hp BMW VI engine, and two synchronized rifle calibre machine guns in the fuselage. Two more guns in the wings were planned.

Specifications

References

1920s German fighter aircraft
Rohrbach aircraft
Single-engined tractor aircraft
Parasol-wing aircraft
Aircraft first flown in 1926